GlenOak High School is a public high school in Plain Township, Ohio, United States, near Canton. It is the only high school in the Plain Local School District. Sports teams are called the Golden Eagles, and they compete in the Ohio High School Athletic Association as a member of the Federal League.

Campus

Plain Local finished construction of the new GlenOak Community Campus for the 2006–2007 school year, a high school with a public library situated within the building. Designed by architects Perkins+Will, it incorporates an 'academy' design. Seven academies are within the school, as following:
 9th Grade Academy
 Arts and Communication Academy
 Business and Marketing Academy
 Environmental Sciences Academy
 Health Sciences Academy
 Human Services Academy
 Industrial and Engineering Academy
 Freshman Arts Program

The Community Campus includes an incorporated public library, a video studio, a 900-seat theater with balcony, and a blackbox. It also sports two gymnasiums, the main gym and a smaller auxiliary gym, softball and baseball fields and a new multi-purpose stadium with Field Turf, named "Bob Commings Field". The stadium enhancements are being funded privately through community support. Design of permanent facilities within the stadium were completed in 2008 and an outdoor learning lab is being built near the main retention pond. An adjacent property was bought by Plain Township to be converted to a park, and walking trails from the park will wind through the campus. Additional partnerships are being considered, such as partnerships with colleges and universities.

Administration:
Gayle Kimbrough , Building Principal
Brett Niarchos, Deputy Principal
Jerad Buck, Academy Principal: Business and Marketing
Leigh Anne Helson, Academy Principal: Arts and Communication/Career Tech Coordinator
Deb Pickering, Academy Principal: Engineering and Industrial Technology/Health Services
Scott Esporite, Academy Principal: 9th Grade Academy

Clubs and activities
The school's Latin Club functions as a local chapter of both the Ohio Junior Classical League (OJCL) and National Junior Classical League (NJCL). The school's Gay Straight Alliance club was created in the 2011-2012 school year by two juniors, Ellenore Holbrook and David Seatter. It was the first Gay-Straight Alliance Created in the area, launching an increase in clubs around Canton, Ohio. The marching band performs at every football game and multiple band shows. After the football season, students audition for either concert band (class C) or Symphonic Winds (class A). Other optional instrumental ensembles include Jazz and Pep bands.

Athletics
GlenOak is part of the Federal League, an athletic conference that includes the nearby schools of Green High School, Jackson High School, Lake High, McKinley High, North Canton Hoover High, and Perry High.

The school nickname is the Golden Eagle and the mascot is Ernie the Eagle. This, too, represents a combination of the former Glenwood and Oakwood high school traditions. Prior to the merger of those schools in 1975, Glenwood's teams were known as the Eagles, with school colors of red and blue, while Oakwood's were the Golden Raiders, with school colors of green and gold. When the schools were merged to form GlenOak, the mascot became the Golden Eagle, while Oakwood's school colors were retained. (Similarly, the district's former junior high school teams were once known as the Taft Senators and the Middlebranch Diamonds. Those names were discontinued when the district applied the "Golden Eagle" nickname and colors to all schools in the 1980s. Taft and Middlebranch—the latter the original high school in the district—became elementary schools in 2006 as Glenwood and Oakwood became middle schools). The boys basketball team qualified for the OHSAA Final Four in 2007 led by All-American Kosta Koufos. The football team qualified for the OHSAA Playoffs during coach Scott Garcias(Class of 1987) first 3 years advancing to the regional finals in 2008. The Boys Cross Country team, under Head Coach Bryan Krosse, went to the state tournament in 2009.  They finished in 6th place.

OHSAA State Championships

 Boys Baseball – 1995, 1996
 Girls Basketball – 1989
 Girls Cross Country – 1988 
 Girls Swimming – 1982

Other State Championships
 Boys Water Polo* - 1987
 Girls Water Polo - 1985, 1986, 1987

Notable alumni
 Cleve Bryant, former head coach Ohio University
 Dan Dierdorf, former American football player, television sportscaster
 Dustin Fox, former NFL cornerback (Class of 2001)
 Tim Fox, former American football player
 Brian Hartline, Former NFL wide receiver (Class of 2005)
 Joshua Jay, magician (Class of 1999)
 Amanda Kloots, co-host of CBS's The Talk
 Kosta Koufos, basketball player (Class of 2007)
 Marilyn Manson (born Brian Warner), musician (Class of 1987)
 CJ McCollum (born 1991), basketball player (Class of 2009)
 Mark Murphy (born 1958), American football player 
 Brian Pittman, musician (Class of 1999)
 Christina Romer, economics professor and presidential advisor
 Mike Sievert, CEO of T-Mobile US (Class of 1987)
 Jeff Shreve, American Public Address Announcer (Class of 1983)
 Matt Thiessen, musician (Class of 1999)

Notes and references

High schools in Stark County, Ohio
Public high schools in Ohio
2006 establishments in Ohio
Educational institutions established in 2006